Lomaria is a genus of ferns belonging to the family Blechnaceae.

Species
In the circumscription used in the Pteridophyte Phylogeny Group classification of 2016 (PPG I), the genus contains six species:
Lomaria brunea (M.Kessler & A.R.Sm.) Gasper & V.A.O.Dittrich
Lomaria discolor (G.Forst.) Willd.
Lomaria inflexa Kunze
Lomaria nuda (Labill.) Willd. (syn. Blechnum nudum (Labill.) Mett.)
Lomaria oceanica (Rosenst.) Gasper & V.A.O.Dittrich (syn. Blechnum oceanicum (Rosenst.) Brownlie
Lomaria spannagelii (Rosenst.) Gasper & V.A.O.Dittrich (syn. Blechnum spannagelii Rosenst.)

References

Blechnaceae
Fern genera